Embrace is the debut record and the only release by the American post-hardcore band Embrace.

The album, released by Dischord Records, consists of songs composed and performed in the context of Washington, D.C.'s 1985 Revolution Summer by one of its mainstay acts. Although recorded between November 1985 and February 1986, the album would not be released until 1987, after the demise of that social movement and the dissolution of the band.

Production and release
Embrace was compiled from the only two studio sessions the band recorded. The first eleven tracks were laid down in November 1985, while the other three were done in February 1986. All of the songs were recorded by the same lineup at Inner Ear Studios in Arlington, Virginia, with Don Zientara as audio engineer.

The album was released in September 1987 on Dischord Records, in LP format.

Critical reception
Though not "as gripping or inventive" as that of Fugazi's, the music in the record, "as a vehicle for [Ian MacKaye's] righteous, cutting lyrics and strong voice", is "more than fine", according to reviewer Ned Raggett, who has described it as having production values that switched around from the "usual domination via guitar" with an emphasis on Ivor Hanson's drums, while comparing the work of guitarist Michael Hampton to John McGeoch's early work with post-punk bands Magazine and Siouxsie and the Banshees.

Trouser Press, for its part, was of the view that:

For Mark Jenkins, co-author with Mark Andersen of the book Dance of Days: Two Decades of Punk in the Nation's Capital:

Jenkins also pointed out that:

Reissues
In 1992, Embrace was reissued on CD and Compact Cassette, featuring alternate cover art.

In 2002, the original album was remastered by Chad Clark at Silver Sonya Recording and Mastering in Arlington, Virginia, for its re-release on CD, featuring, as bonus tracks, previously unreleased alternate versions of "Money" and "Dance of Days" taken from band's second recording session. This edition was reissued in 2008 on red vinyl, although without the additional cuts.

Also in 2002, the song "Money" was featured on the 3-CD compilation box set 20 Years of Dischord.

In 2009, the album was remastered again, this time at Chicago Mastering Service in Chicago, Illinois, for a reissue in its original vinyl disc format and cover art.

Track listings

1987 LP release

2002 remastered CD reissue

Personnel

Embrace
 Ian MacKaye – vocals
 Mike Hampton – guitar (except for track B5)
 Chris Bald – bass
 Ivor Hanson – drums
 Edward Janney – guitar (B5)

Production
 Embrace - production (A1 to B4)
 Ian MacKaye - co-production (B5 to B7)
 Edward Janney - co-production (B5 to B7)
 Don Zientara – engineering
 Chris Bald – artwork (front cover drawing)
 Cynthia Connolly – artwork (back cover screen printing)
 Leslie Clague – photography

Additional production (1992 CD and MC reissues)
 J. Robbins – graphic design
 Chris Bald – artwork (front cover drawing)
 Cynthia Connolly – artwork (CD back cover screen printing)
 Leslie Clague – photography
 Tina Atkinson – photography
 Kathy Cashel – typography
 Jane Bogart – illegible credit

Additional production (2002 remastered CD reissue)
 Ian MacKaye - co-production (15, 16)
 Edward Janney - co-production (15, 16)
 Chad Clark - remastering
 Jason Farrell – graphic design
 Chris Bald – artwork (front cover drawing)
 Cynthia Connolly – artwork (inlay screen printing)
 Leslie Clague – photography
 Dave McDuff – photography

Additional production (2009 remastered LP reissue)
 Jason Ward - remastering

See also
 Revolution Summer

Notes

References

Further reading
Magazines
 Sprouse, Martin (November 1987). Embrace. Maximumrocknroll (54).
 Beaujon, Andrew (November 1999). "Emossentials - 03 Embrace". Spin 15 (11): 148.

External links
 Embrace. Dischord Records.

Articles
 Smith, Chris (August 12, 2002). "Caught at a Distance - Embrace, Rites of Spring, and One Last Wish". Stylus Magazine.

Reviews
 Leland, John; Rabid, Jack; Fasolino, Greg. "Minor Threat". Trouser Press.
 Sabo (July 31, 2003). "Embrace – s/t (Dischord, 1986)". Blogcritics.
 Jenkins, Mark (April 22, 2011). "Wondering Sound - Reviews: Embrace, Embrace". Wondering Sound.
 Norton, Justin M. (October 17, 2012). "13 Essential DC Hardcore Albums: Embrace - Embrace (Dischord, 1987)". Stereogum.
 Prindle, Mark. "Embrace: The Good Will Out My Eye!". Mark's Record Reviews.
 Chedsey, John (March 2000). "Embrace: Embrace". Satan Stole My Teddybear. Archived from the original on February 2, 2016.

Videos
 Zararity (December 29, 2014). Embrace - Live at the 9:30 Club, Washington, D.C. 1986 (Complete and remastered) (Embrace's final show). YouTube.

Embrace (American band) albums
1987 debut albums